Norfolk and Western 433 is a preserved class M 4-8-0 "Mastodon" type steam locomotive built by the American Locomotive Company's Richmond Locomotive Works in January 1907 for the Norfolk and Western Railway. It was one of 125 M Class engines in operation on the N&W for around 50 years. After surviving an accident in 1951, the 433 was rebuilt and worked in Bristol, Virginia for a time where she was also assigned as a back up locomotive for the Abingdon Branch. This "Mollie" also worked as a switcher in Roanoke, Salem, and Radford. The 433 was eventually retired in 1958 and it became one of only two M Class locomotives to survive aside from the "Lost Engines of Roanoke". It was cosmetically restored in 2002 and now resides as a static display along the old Virginia Creeper Trail in Abingdon.

History

Original service life 
The Norfolk & Western Railway (N&W), a company that mainly operated in Virginia and West Virginia, preferred 4-8-0 "Mastodon" types over 2-8-2 "Mikados" as their non-articulated freight locomotives. The Mastodons were highly versatile locomotives and were often nicknamed "Mollies" by old time railroaders. They had a total of seventy-five M class Mastodons built by the American Locomotive Company (ALCO) in Richmond, Virginia and fifty built by the Baldwin Locomotive Works in Philadelphia, Pennsylvania between 1906 and 1907, being numbered 375–499. In 1907, another fifty were built by Alco and fifty by Baldwin all designated as M1s and numbered 1000–1099. In 1910, fifty more came from Baldwin, designated as M2s and numbered 1100–1160. The 433 was among the last locomotives of the M class built in January 1907. During the early years of the N&W, the 433 was assigned to mainline freight and passenger service, as well as local yard work. In the 1920s, when larger and heavier locomotives were being introduced, like the Y class mallets, the "Mollies" were all reassigned to branch lines.

One such branch line the 433 was assigned to was the Abington branch, known as the Virginia Creeper that laid between Abingdon and West Jefferson, North Carolina, where steep grades, sharp curves, and wooden trestles prohibited using locomotives any heavier than a Mastodon. In 1951, No. 433 was figured in a wreck, and was afterwards rebuilt, and since she wasn't superheated like most of her sisters were, she was reassigned as a yard switcher in Bristol. On at least one occasion, No. 433 teamed up with two fellow Mastodons for a tripleheader on the Virginia Creeper to pull carloads of gravel South-bound to North Carolina. Upon arrival at White Top station, the No. 433 ended her "helper duty" and returned to Bristol tender first, since there was no turntable, nor a wye to turn the locomotive around at White Top, or Abingdon. The year 1957, was the last year when steam operations occurred at the Virginia Creeper, ending with Mollies 382 and 429, before the branch made a complete transition to diesel power. The following year, after more than fifty years of revenue service, the 433 completed her last freight assignment before its fire was dropped one last time.

Preservation 
The Town of Abingdon wanted a steam locomotive for static display as a monument to the Virginia Creeper, so the N&W donated the No. 433, which arrived at Radford before being moved to her present display site in November 1958. The locomotive would spend the next sixty-three years under a wooden roof for protection from the weather. However, the No. 433 was still exposed to the elements and vandals, which resulted in significant deterioration and damage. By 1974, the N&W petitioned the Interstate Commerce Commission to abandon the branch, and by 1984, the line was ripped up and converted into a trail, as it was secured by the US Forest Service to create the Virginia Creeper Trail. In 2002, volunteers from the Virginia Creeper Trail Club, in partnership with the Washington County Preservation Foundation, began a project to cosmetically restore the No. 433 back to the way it was donated forty-six years prior. Local businesses contributed material and labor to this effort, and volunteers constructed and painted windows and doors, and they cleaned and painted the tender and interior of the cab. The old building that covered the locomotive was also torn down and replaced by a steel one. Two marker lights were bought for the smokebox of the locomotive, replacing those that were stolen more than twenty years prior.

Surviving sister engines 

 Norfolk and Western Railway 475 is the only other M class Mollie that was left to survive, and it is an older locomotive than the 433, despite the higher road number. It has been sold and moved several times between 1960 and 1985. It has been operating on the Strasburg Rail Road in Strasburg, Pennsylvania since 1993.
 There are three younger surviving N&W Mastodons known as the "Lost Engines of Roanoke", them being two M2 locomotives, numbers 1118, 1134, and one M2c, 1151, which have resided in the Virginia Scrap Iron & Metal yard from 1950 to 2009. M2c No. 1151 was moved on August 21, 2009, M2 No. 1134 moved on August 24, and M2 No. 1118 on August 26. The 1134 has received cosmetic restoration and is now located at the Railroad Museum of Virginia, in Portsmouth. 1118 was traded for 0-6-0T No. 34 and will remain at NRHS chapter's 9th Street facility. 1151 was moved to the Virginia Museum of Transportation in Roanoke.

See also 

 Norfolk and Western 578
 Southern Railway 107
 Southern Railway 385
 Florida East Coast 153

References

External links 
 Virginia Creeper Trail Official Website

4-8-0 locomotives
433
Individual locomotives of the United States
Standard gauge locomotives of the United States
Preserved steam locomotives of Virginia